Pleurosicya mossambica, also known as the toothy goby or the Mozambique ghost goby, is a small species of goby native to the tropical Indo-West Pacific region. It was first described by South African ichthyologist J.L.B. Smith in 1959. Like many other gobies, it forms commensal relationships with several other marine invertebrates, including soft corals and sponges.

Naming and etymology
Pleurosicya mossambica is known by a wide variety of common names, including the toothy goby, common ghost goby, ghost goby, gudgeon, manyhost cling-goby, manyhost goby, Mozambique ghost goby, and reef goby. Its generic name, Pleurosicya, is derived from the Greek pleura, meaning side, and sikya, as in cucumber. Its species name, mossambica, refers to Mozambique, the region in which it was first discovered.

Description
It is a pale red in coloration, and the body is partially translucent. It has seven dorsal spines, seven to eight dorsal soft rays, one anal spine, and eight anal soft rays. The eyes are prominent with red and yellow rings, and are positioned at roughly 45 degrees on each side of the head to allow it a greater field of vision. Their pelvic fins have evolved into sucker-like appendages, which allow them to attach themselves to corals in high-current areas.

Diet
The diet of Pleurosicya mossambica primarily consists of zooplankton, as well as mucus and polyps off of corals. It is known to clean ectoparasites off of other fish in captivity, and may do this in the wild with its hosts as well.

Reproduction
Pleurosicya mossambica is a protogynous species, meaning that they are sequential hermaphrodites with female sexual organs reaching maturity before male sexual organs. It is a benthic spawner, typically depositing its eggs on ascidians or soft corals.

Distribution and habitat
Pleurosicya mossambica is native to the greater Indo-West Pacific region. The limits of its range extend as far west as the Red Sea and the eastern African coastline, as far east as Fiji and the Marquesas Islands, as far north as southern Japan, and as far south as southeastern Australia and New Caledonia.

Ecology
Pleurosicya mossambica lives amongst a variety of hosts, including but not limited to soft corals, sponges, Tridacna, broad-blade plants, algae, and bivalves. There is at least one recorded instance of it living among the blue sea cucumber (Actinopyga caerulea) off the coast of Bitung as well.

Relationship with humans

Conservation status
The IUCN lists the conservation status of Pleurosicya mossambica as a least-concern species. There are no known major threats to the species, and it is not frequently seen in trade. While not explicitly protected, its natural range does overlap with several protected areas, including the Great Barrier Reef Marine Park in Australia and the Natural Park of the Coral Sea in New Caledonia.

In captivity
Pleurosicya mossambica is rarely, but nevertheless on occasion, seen in the aquarium trade. In captivity, specimens require a minimum of 13 gallons of water in order to survive. They will consume zooplankton and small crustaceans such as krill, mysis shrimp, and artemia. Care must be taken to ensure that they do not get lost in aquarium overflows due to their small size.

References

Gobiidae
Vertebrates of Fiji
Fish of Australia
Fish of Indonesia
Fish of Japan
Fish of New Caledonia
Fish of the Comoros
Fish of the Philippines
Fish of the Red Sea
Marine fauna of East Africa
Taxa named by J. L. B. Smith
Fish described in 1959